Arnold Islets are about 3 islands about 10 km east of the Apudthama National Park in the Great Barrier Reef Marine Park Queensland, Australia, in the Cape York Peninsula about 70 km southeast of Bamaga.

The island covers an area of about 5 hectares.

See also

 List of islands of Australia

References 

Islands on the Great Barrier Reef
Uninhabited islands of Australia